Kaye Coppoolse (born 3 January 1991) is a Dutch retired footballer who played as a striker.

Club career
Coppoolse came through the De Graafschap youth system and made his professional debut for their senior squad on 18 December 2010 against SC Heerenveen. He later played on loan for Veendam before moving into amateur football with WKE, Babberich, VIOD and AFC Arnhem.

Tattoo artist
Coppoolse runs his own tattoo shop in Drempt.

References

External links
 Voetbal International 

1991 births
Living people
People from Doetinchem
Footballers from Gelderland
Association football forwards
Dutch footballers
De Graafschap players
SC Veendam players
WKE players
Eredivisie players
Eerste Divisie players
Dutch tattoo artists